The Out-of-Towners is a 1999 American comedy film starring Steve Martin and Goldie Hawn. It is a remake of the 1970 film of the same name written by Neil Simon and starring Jack Lemmon and Sandy Dennis.

Plot
Henry and Nancy Clark are a couple living in a quiet Ohio town. Married for 27 years, their last child Alan has left home for Europe and Nancy is suffering from empty nest syndrome. 

Unbeknownst to Nancy, Henry has lost his job due to corporate downsizing and has an interview in New York. She sneaks on the plane with him and they begin a disastrous series of misadventures. 

Their plane is rerouted to Boston due to poor weather and their luggage is lost. They rent an overly expensive car after missing the train to NYC. They are mugged at gunpoint and their daughter Susan has used the only credit card Henry still had to the point where it has reached its limit. 

The couple is thrown out of their hotel by the pompous manager Mersault. So, Nancy decides to find Susan at her apartment, but her untrusting neighbors run them off. 

They duck into a church, inadvertly walking into a support group for sex addicts. Put on the spot to share, Nancy admits they haven't had sex for months. When pressed for an explanation, Henry finally admits he got laid off, and the stress has taken his drive, which upsets her as they are keeping secrets from each other.

They return to the hotel in search for their bags, as Nancy remembers there are travelers' checks. With no bags yet, they sneak into a bar and she lets a man, Greg, hit on her to get his room key. Saying she'll wait for him in his room while he's seeing a show for work, she and Henry order room service. Greg catches them, and calls the police.

Sneaking onto the balcony, they manage to slip onto the floor below, they see Mersault indulging in secretly cross dressing using guests' clothing. Forced to live by their wits on the street, the couple get into a cab which had been stolen by thieves. Then they jump from the moving car and find themselves in Central Park. 

Becoming amorous, the couple are discovered and then chased by the mounted police. They end up falling asleep in a lean-to in the park. Early in the morning, as he's relieving himself, Henry is arrested for indecent exposure. Nancy blackmails Mersault into helping them. 

In the end, Henry aces his job interview and he and Nancy begin a new life together in New York City. They (as well as Mersault openly in full-drag) go to see their daughter perform on Broadway.

Cast
Steve Martin as Henry Clark
Goldie Hawn as Nancy Clark
Mark McKinney as Greg
Oliver Hudson as Alan Clark
John Cleese as Mr. Mersault

Production
Steve Martin and Goldie Hawn first worked together in Housesitter (1992).

Henry and Nancy Clark's son Alan is played by Goldie Hawn's real-life son, Oliver Hudson.

Much footage from the film was reportedly stolen, which resulted in many scenes having to be reshot.

Reception
The Out-of-Towners was a disappointment critically and commercially. It has a 28% rating on the Rotten Tomatoes website from 39 reviews. The site's consensus states: "Solid source material and a cast of talented comedians aren't enough to make The Out-of-Towners worth hosting on a screen of any size."

Roger Ebert commented that the movie "was not a proud moment in the often-inspired careers of Martin and Hawn." Most of the negative reviews point to Cleese as the only redeeming factor of the film.

See also
 List of American films of 1999

References

External links
 

The Out-of-Towners at Box Office Mojo

1999 films
1999 comedy films
American comedy films
Remakes of American films
1990s English-language films
Films set in Boston
Films set in New York City
Films shot in Massachusetts
Films shot in New York City
Paramount Pictures films
Films based on works by Neil Simon
Films directed by Sam Weisman
Films with screenplays by Marc Lawrence
Films produced by Robert Evans
Films scored by Marc Shaiman
1990s American films